Club Atlético Ituzaingó is an Argentine football club based in Ituzaingó, Buenos Aires. The team currently plays in Primera B Metropolitana, the regionalised third division of the Argentine football league system.

Ituzaingó has mainly played in the 3rd and 4th divisions of Argentine football. Its highest ever league position came in 1992–93 when the squad finished in 17th place in the 2nd division.

Titles
Primera B (1): 1991–92
Primera C: 1'': 2000–01Primera D (2)''': 2005–06, 2016–17

References

External links

 
 Ituzaingo Web 
 Verde León 

 
Association football clubs established in 1912
Football clubs in Buenos Aires Province
Club Atletico
1912 establishments in Argentina